Medea is an opera in three acts composed by Giovanni Pacini to a libretto by Benedetto Castiglia. The libretto is based on the plays Medea by Euripides and Médée by Pierre Corneille.

Performance history
It was further revised for its first performance at La Fenice in Venice on 9 March 1850. The final and definitive version premiered at the Teatro San Carlo in Naples on 26 February 1853. For two decades Pacini's Medea enjoyed considerable popularity in Italy, Russia and South America. It then fell into obscurity, eclipsed by Bellini's Norma which has a similar story and Cherubini's Médée.

Roles

Synopsis
Setting: Corinth in Ancient Greece
The heroic warrior Giasone plans to abandon his wife Medea to marry Glauca the daughter of Creonte, the king of Corinth. In revenge Medea murders their two children and then commits suicide.

Notable arias and duets
"Odi sola in preda" – duet, Giasone and Medea, act 1
"Ah dolci nel seno" – Medea in the finale of act 3 (added in the 1845 Vicenza revision)

References
Notes 

Sources
Pessina, Marino, "Medea", in Gelli, Piero & Poletti, Filippo (ed.), Dizionario dell'Opera 2008, Milano, Baldini Castoldi Dalai, 2007, pp. 828–829,  (in Italian).
Original libretto: Medea. Tragedia lirica, Palermo, Reale Stamperia, 1845

Further reading
Balthazar, S. L., Rose, Michael, and Kaufman, T., "Pacini, Giovanni", The New Grove Dictionary of Music and Musicians'' 2nd Edition, 2001. 
Pacini, Giovanni, Le mie memorie artistiche, G. G. Guidi, 1865

External links

1843 operas
Italian-language operas
Operas
Operas based on Medea (Euripides play)
Operas based on plays
Operas based on works by Pierre Corneille
Operas by Giovanni Pacini